Javier Perez-Capdevila (born February 7, 1963) is a Cuban scientist, mathematician and professor, known for the introduction of the operation mixed mixtures of fuzzy sets, among other theoretical contributions to fuzzy mathematics, as well as to introduce a concept of labor competencies with a method to measure them.

Main scientific contributions 

From the concept of index or coefficient of adequacy given by Jaume Gil Aluja in 1996, many draws in adequacy can occur. To solve it, Pérez Capdevila introduced the concepts of overweight in adaptation, fuzzy coefficient for equal adequacy coefficients and adjusted tiebreaker coefficient for equal adequacy coefficients, which he defines with precision, to unpack in an indefinite number of cases with equal adequacy coefficients, thus rounding out a theory about the suitability of candidates for a preset profile

Built the operation of mixture of fuzzy sets, where from elements of different nature new elements are obtained with their certain degrees of belonging.

In the field of applied mathematics he has achieved important advances regarding the evaluation of the economical effects and control of the exotic invading alien species, and he has accomplished important theoretical contributions. He has contributed to the concepts of individual benefit of an exotic invading alien species, collective benefit of an exotic invading alien species, a priori cost-benefit analysis of an exotic invading alien species, a posteriori cost-benefit analysis of an exotic invading alien species, as well as a method to accomplish those analyses.

In the organizational field, using the mixture of fuzzy sets and the theoretical method of analysis and synthesis, studies the chronological definitions of competencies, and provides a new definition of these (Competence (organization)), which facilitates their measurement. Based on this scientific fact, Perez-Capdevila builds a work algorithm to measure competences from human perception and build maps (defining them), provides a classification of people based on the elements of their competences, provides a procedure to correlate competencies and salary, and builds a simulator that links competencies with productivity and quality of work.

He created a method to determine the relationship between work competences and salaries, which evaluates the losses that can be generated due to the lack of competences (whether laboral or professional). In the same way he constructed a simulating device to relate competences with productivity of the work and quality of work.

Criticizes the way in which the SWOT analysis (Strengths, Opportunities, Weaknesses and Threats) is carried out. According to Perez-Capdevila, the use of limited options to assess impacts, as well as equal weighting among all Strengths, Opportunities, Weaknesses or Threats. According to him, it is a model that does not fit reality. He proposed an alternative procedure to carry out this analysis, where he addresses the problem of inconsistency that could be generated in expert votes.

He directed the first study of perception of science and technology that was carried out in Cuba, taking as a context the Guantanamo province where he resides, and stood out as a researcher in the first study of evaluation of sustainability in Cuba], in collaboration with several Cuban and Spanish universities.

Contributed two new concepts: return potential and immigration potential, whose application is intended for the repopulation process of the Cuban mountains.

He has written several books and scientific articles among which "The Age of Knowledge", "Definition, measurement and maps of labor competencies" and "Science and technology from a popular point of view" stand out.

Awards and distinctions 
 National Prize of the Academy of Sciences of Cuba, which is the highest Prize awarded by the Academy of Sciences of Cuba to Cuban scientists for relevant results with manifest impacts.
 Order (distinction) "Carlos Juan Finlay": It is the greatest scientific recognition granted in Cuba. This award is conferred by the State Council of the Republic of Cuba to Cuban and foreign citizens in recognition of extraordinary merits for valuable contributions to the development of Natural or Social Sciences, to scientific or research activities that have contributed exceptionally to the progress of the sciences and for the benefit of humanity.
 Commemorative Seal “Antonio Bachiller y Morales”: The highest award granted by the Cuban Society of Information Sciences for relevant contributions to Knowledge Management, both in the field of theory and in practice.
 Honorary Seal "Forgers of the Future": Awarded by the National Presidency of the Technical Youth Brigades of Cuba in an exceptional way to outstanding personalities of science.
 Distinction Juan Tomás Roig, for more than 30 years of services, in recognition to the merits reached like worker linked to the scientific chore in several branches of the economy and of the social life of the country.
 Honorary title (academic) of Professor of the COMFENALCO Foundation of Colombia.

References
Notes

Sources
Thomson Reuters
ORCID
DIALNET

1963 births
Living people
20th-century Cuban mathematicians
21st-century Cuban mathematicians
Business theorists
Cuban economists